Samantha: An American Girl Holiday is a 2004 television film, based on the American Girl children's books written by Susan S. Adler and Valerie Tripp. The film follows young, wealthy Samantha Parkington's adventures with three poor orphan girls. Shot in Toronto, Ontario, Canada, the 86-minute film features lavish period costumes and settings, and was nominated for three Young Artist Awards, winning one.

Samantha is the first in the series of An American Girl films.

Plot
Samantha and Nellie become fast friends. The girls turn to each other in happiness and sorrow, adventure and danger, and grow as close as sisters.

It is then learned that Nellie's mother died last fall and that Samantha is an orphan as her parents died in an accident by the river. One of the mementos she has of them is a locket with their pictures. Shortly, Samantha's Uncle Gardner, who is settled in New York, pays a visit home with his fiancé Cornelia. Uncle 
Gard announces that he and Cornelia are engaged. Samantha is unhappy by this turn of events but agrees to be the bridesmaid for the wedding. Soon after, Samantha moves to New York to attend a new school.

Cast
AnnaSophia Robb as Samantha Parkington
Kelsey Lewis as Nellie O'Malley
Mia Farrow as Mary Edwards
Jordan Bridges as Gardner Edwards
Rebecca Mader as Cornelia Edwards
Olivia Ballantyne as Jenny O'Malley
Hannah Endicott-Douglas as Bridget O'Malley
Michael Kanev as Eddie Ryland
Karen Eyo as School Principal
Keir Gilchrist as Factory Boy
Shary Guthrie as Teacher
Jackie Brown as Factory Lady
Shae Norris as Agatha
Clare Stone as Emma
Nancy E.L. Ward as Lillian
Janine Theriault as Beatrice

Awards and nominations

Young Artist Awards

|-
| rowspan="3" |2005
|Olivia Ballantyne
|Best Performance in a TV Movie, Miniseries Or Special — Supporting Young Actress
| 
|-
|Samantha: An American Girl Holiday
|Best Family Television Movie or Special
| 
|-
|AnnaSophia Robb
|Best Performance in a TV Movie, Miniseries or Special – Leading Young Actress
|

References

External links

 

2004 television films
2004 films
American Girl films
American television films
Christmas television films
Films about orphans
Films based on American novels
Films directed by Nadia Tass
Films set in 1904
Films set in New York (state)
Films shot in Toronto
New York City in fiction
American children's films
American Christmas films
Works about child labour
Films about labour
2000s American films